Kingbee is an extinct town in Ripley County, in the U.S. state of Missouri.

A post office called Kingbee was established in 1896, and remained in operation until 1909. The community was so named on account of its status as an economic center.

References

Ghost towns in Missouri
Former populated places in Ripley County, Missouri